Johannine literature is the collection of New Testament works that are traditionally attributed to John the Apostle, John the Evangelist, or to the Johannine community. They are usually dated to the period , with a minority of scholars such as John AT Robinson offering the earliest of these datings.

List

Johannine literature is traditionally considered to include the following works:
 The Gospel of John
 The Johannine epistles
 The First Epistle of John
 The Second Epistle of John
 The Third Epistle of John
 The Book of Revelation

Authorship
Of these five books, the only one that explicitly identifies its author as a "John" is Revelation. Modern scholarship generally rejects the idea that this work is written by the same author as the other four documents. The gospel identifies its author as the disciple whom Jesus loved, commonly identified with John the Evangelist since the end of the first century.

Scholars have debated the authorship of Johannine literature (the Gospel of John, Epistles of John, and the Book of Revelation) since at least the third century, but especially since the Enlightenment. The authorship by John the Apostle is rejected by many modern scholars.

See also
 Apocryphon of John
 Second Apocalypse of John

References

Sources

Bibliography 

Bellinzoni, Arthur J. (25 February 2000). The Early Christian Community: From Diversity to Unity to Orthodoxy. Lecture delivered to the Wells College Faculty Club.

1st-century Christianity
2nd-century Christianity
Biblical criticism
New Testament content